Zeng Liansong (17 December 1917 － 19 October 1999) was the designer of the Flag of the People's Republic of China. He was from Rui'an, Wenzhou, Zhejiang province.

He entered the economics department at the National Central University (Nanjing University) in 1936.  During the Second Sino-Japanese War, he joined the war effort against Japanese forces. He was also a member of the standing committee of the CPPCC Shanghai committee.

Following the establishment of the People's Republic of China, Zeng designed a flag for the new nation. It depicted a field of Chinese red with four gold stars around a larger star in the canton. The larger star contained the hammer and sickle symbol of communism. Zeng's design was very similar to the design that the nation ended up adopting, the only difference being the removal of the hammer and sickle symbol from the larger star.

He died in 1999 at the age of 81.

References

1917 births
1999 deaths
Flag designers
National Central University alumni
20th-century  Chinese economists
People from Rui'an